The White House Office on Clean Energy Innovation and Implementation is an office within the White House Office that is part of the Executive Office of the President of the United States. It was established on September 12, 2022, by Joe Biden via executive order in order to coordinate the policymaking process with respect to implementing the energy and infrastructure provisions of the Inflation Reduction Act and other essential initiatives. Biden selected John Podesta as Senior Advisor for Clean Energy Innovation and Implementation, which heads the office and reports directly to the President. In addition, the Senior Advisor for Clean Energy Innovation and Implementation chairs the National Climate Task Force, while the White House National Climate Advisor serves as Vice Chair.

References 

Executive Office of the President of the United States